Boschert is a surname. Notable people with the surname include:

David G. Boschert (1947–2011), American politician
Reinhold Boschert (born 1947), German long jumper
Sherry Boschert, American writer and activist

See also
Boschert Glacier, a glacier of Marie Byrd Land, Antarctica